Reynaldo Proenza Ribot (or Reinaldo Proenza Rivo, born 20 November 1984 in San Antonio de los Baños, La Habana) is a male shot putter from Cuba.

Personal best
His personal best throw is 20.30 metres, achieved on 19 July 2008 in Havana.

Achievements

References

External links
Sports reference biography

1984 births
Living people
Cuban male shot putters
Athletes (track and field) at the 2008 Summer Olympics
Athletes (track and field) at the 2011 Pan American Games
Olympic athletes of Cuba
People from Havana
Central American and Caribbean Games silver medalists for Cuba
Competitors at the 2006 Central American and Caribbean Games
Central American and Caribbean Games medalists in athletics
Pan American Games competitors for Cuba
21st-century Cuban people